Bonomi is an Italian surname. Notable people with the surname include:

Andrea Bonomi (1923–2003), footballer
Beniamino Bonomi (born 1968), Italian canoer
Carlo Bonomi (born 1937), Italian voice actor
Ignatius Bonomi (1787–1870), English architect
Ivanoe Bonomi (1873–1951), Italian prime minister
Joseph Bonomi the Elder (1739–1808), English architect
Joseph Bonomi the Younger (1796–1878), English sculptor

See also
 Samuel Bonom (1912–1962), New York politician

Italian-language surnames